Upper Senegal and Niger was a colony in French West Africa, created on 21 October 1904 from colonial Senegambia and Niger by the decree "For the Reorganisation of the general government of French West Africa".

At its creation, the "Colony of Upper Senegal and Niger" contained the old territories of Upper Senegal, the Middle Niger, and the military Niger territory. Its capital was Bamako.

History
From early on Upper Senegal and Niger was wracked by violence in the face of colonial reorganization and taxation. Most notable were the Kobkitanda rebellion, led by the blind cleric Alfa Saibou, and the Karma revolt (December 1905–March 1906) of Oumarou Karma. The latter engulfed much of the Niger valley and was suppressed by four French columns arriving from Dori, Gao, Tahoua, and Zinder.

A decree of 2 March 1907 added the cercles of Fada N'gourma and Say, which had been part of the colony of French Dahomey (present-day Benin). On 1 January 1912, the military territory of Niger was split off from Upper Senegal and Niger, and was erected into a colony in 1922.

Between November 1915 and February 1917, the Colony of Upper Senegal and Niger witnessed vastly popular, temporarily successful, and sustained armed opposition to the colonial government in its western Volta region, which is referred to as the Volta-Bani War. It challenged colonial government authority for more than a year in an area stretching from Koudougou (in present-day Burkina Faso) in the east, to the banks of the Bani River (present-day Mali) in the west. This was the most significant armed opposition to colonial authority organized anywhere in sub-Saharan Africa in the period preceding World War II.

Division
After World War I ended, the unsuspected success of this resistance movement caused the French authorities to issue the decree "Concerning the Division of the Colony of Upper Senegal and Niger and the Creation of the Colony of Upper Volta" of 1 March 1919, which divided the colony into two distinct units:
 French Upper Volta, formed from the cercles of Gaoua, Bobo-Dioulasso, Dédougou, Ouagadougou, Dori, Say, and Fada N'Gourma;
 the remaining territory – present-day Mali – was still called "Upper Senegal and Niger" until it was renamed "French Sudan" on 1 January 1921, implementing the decree of 4 December 1920, "For the Denomination of the Colonies and Territories Composing the General Government of French West Africa."

Stamps

The colony of Upper Senegal and Niger is perhaps remembered most often by philatelists since it issued a number of postage stamps during its existence.

See also

References

External links 
 

French West Africa
French Sudan
Former colonies in Africa
Former French colonies
History of Mali
History of Niger
History of Senegal
French colonisation in Africa
States and territories established in 1904
States and territories disestablished in 1921
1904 establishments in French West Africa
1921 disestablishments in French West Africa
France–Mali relations
France–Niger relations
France–Senegal relations
Former countries of the interwar period